Project 1950 is the sixth studio album by the American horror punk band the Misfits, released in 2003. It consists of cover versions of rock and roll songs from the 1950s and 1960s and marks bassist Jerry Only's debut as the Misfits' lead singer. Except for Only, no members of the band from their previous album returned for Project 1950. The album cover artwork was done by Pennsylvania artist Tony Squindo. The liner notes include explanations from the band members about why they chose each particular song.

Receiving generally positive critical reviews from publications such as Allmusic, the album became a commercial success and hit the #2 slot on Billboard's 'Top Heatseekers' chart as well as #5 on its 'Top Independent Albums' chart. Ronnie Spector guest starred as a backing vocalist on two tracks. Other members of the band at that point had also previously been associated with famous groups, with the album also including work from punk rockers Marky Ramone of the Ramones and Dez Cadena of Black Flag.

In October 2014, the band released an expanded edition of the album, adding three new tracks with current drummer Eric "Chupacabra" Arce performing on the new tracks. A limited picture disc LP of the expanded album was also released with new artwork by Tom Whalen

Reception 

The album received positive reviews. AllMusic ran a supportive review by critic Johnny Loftus, who stated that "it's good to hear their excitement in the recordings, which crackle with enthusiasm" and called the album "really enjoyable in a nostalgia sort of way". Reviewing the Expanded Edition of the album Ken Pierce, of Piercing Metal stated "Overall the tunes retain a large part of their original sound but with there being renditions by The Misfits they are faster and quicker to finish when it all comes down to it." rating the album 4 out of 5.

Track listing

Chart positions

Bonus DVD 
 "This Magic Moment"
 "Dream Lover"
 "Diana"
 "Donna"
 "Runaway"
Tracks 1-4, recorded at the Phillips US Open Snowboarding Championships
Track 5, recorded live, at The World in NYC

Bonus material
Day the Earth Caught Fire: Live in NYC- Misfits with Balzac
The Haunting/Don't Open 'Till Doomsday: Live in Japan- Balzac with Misfits
Day the Earth Caught Fire: Live in Japan- Balzac with Misfits
The Haunting/Don't Open 'Till Doomsday- Balzac
Out of the Blue- Balzac

Personnel 
Jerry Only – bass, lead vocals
Marky Ramone – drums, percussion
Dez Cadena – guitars
John Cafiero – background vocals on "Dream Lover", "Monster Mash" and "Runaway"
Ronnie Spector – background vocals on "This Magic Moment" and "You Belong to Me"
Jimmy Destri – keyboards on "Runaway" and "Great Balls of Fire"
Ed Manion – saxophone on "Diana" and "Runaway"
Eric "Chupacabra" Arce – drums, percussion on "Witchcraft", "Daughter of Darkness" and "(You're the) Devil in Disguise"

References 

Misfits (band) albums
2003 albums
Covers albums
Rykodisc albums